The Global Chinese Music Awards (abbreviated as GCMA)() is a music awards founded by seven Mandarin radio stations in 2001, including Hit FM, RTHK, East Radio Pop, Radio Guangdong, Beijing Yinyue Tai, Y.E.S. 93.3FM, and 988 FM.

Ceremonies

Categories 
 Most Popular Male Artiste
 Most Popular Female Artiste
 Best Male Artiste
 Best Female Artiste
 Media Recommendation
 Top Five Most Popular Male Artistes
 Top Five Most Popular Female Artistes
 Outstanding Regional Artiste (Beijing)
 Outstanding Regional Artiste (Guangdong)
 Outstanding Regional Artiste (Hong Kong)
 Outstanding Regional Artiste (Shanghai)
 Outstanding Regional Artiste (Taiwan)
 Outstanding Regional Artiste (Malaysia)
 Outstanding Regional Artiste (Singapore)
 Best Male Stage Performer
 Best Female Stage Performer
 Most Popular Composing Artiste
 Most Popular Group
 Most Popular Band
 Most Popular New Artiste
 Versatile Artiste
 Best Album
 Best Album Producer
 Best Lyricist
 Best Composer
 Best Arranger
 Most Popular Duet
 Top Twenty Hits

References 

Chinese music awards